The Women of the Moose are the female auxiliary of the Loyal Order of Moose.

History 

The WOTM originated as the Women of Mooseheart Legion in 1913. In the early years the group had little structure above the Chapter level. In 1926, Katherine Smith, the Director of Public Employment in the Department of Labor under Davis, was appointed the first "Grand Chancellor" of the Women of the Moose. Under her direction the WOM grew to 250,000 members by the time of her retirement in 1964.

Organizations 

Local units are called "Chapters". Officials on the state level are given "Grand" designations and on the national level "Supreme" designations, ergo, "Supreme Secretary", "Grand Secretary" etc. In 1979 there were 1,824 Chapters. Currently there are approximately 1,600 chapters in all 50 states and four Canadian provinces.

Membership 

In 1979 there were 377,282 members. Today there are more than 400,000.

Rituals 
The WOTM works four degrees. The first is the Co-Worker, and is considered necessary to be considered a full member. The other three are Academy of Friendship, College of Regents, and Star Recorder, and are based on merit. On formal occasions members wear Geneva gowns, reminiscent of those worn at college graduations and church choirs. Officers wear different colored stoles.

References

External links 
 

Organizations established in 1913
Women's organizations based in the United States
Moose International
1913 establishments in the United States